The Florida State University/Asolo Conservatory for Actor Training or FSU/Asolo Conservatory for Actor Training is a three-year graduate program culminating in a Master of Fine Arts degree in Acting. The program is operated by Florida State University in conjunction with the Asolo Repertory Theatre.

FSU/Asolo Conservatory
The program was initiated by the Florida State University School of Theatre in Tallahassee in 1968 and moved to Sarasota five years later to establish a permanent relationship with the Asolo Repertory Theatre. It is currently housed in the Florida State University Center for the Performing Arts, which is a multi-theater complex, located on The Ringling property which is managed by Florida State University http://www.ringling.org/

During the third year of the program, students are treated as company members of the Asolo Rep. Upon graduation from the program, students are eligible to join the Actors' Equity Association.

In 2012, the program was named one of the top 25 drama schools in the world by The Hollywood Reporter.  At last listing by the U.S. News & World Report, it was ranked 6th among MFA Acting programs in the United States.

The program auditions 1200-1500 students annually in four locations. It accepts a maximum of 12 students per school year.

2015–2016 season

The season was presented under the helm of Greg Leaming, who has served as the Associate Artistic Director for Asolo Repertory Theatre and Director of the Conservatory for the past eleven years.

 The Real Inspector Hound by Tom Stoppard
 The Liar by David Ives, adapted from the comedy by Pierre Corneille
 Macbeth by William Shakespeare
 Nora by Ingmar Bergman, adapted from Henrik Ibsen's A Doll's House

2014–2015 season

The season was presented under the helm of Greg Leaming, who has served as the Associate Artistic Director for Asolo Repertory Theatre and Director of the Conservatory for the past ten years.

 The Water Engine by David Mamet
 As You Like It by William Shakespeare
 title of show by Jeff Bowen and Hunter Bell
 The Cherry Orchard by Anton Chekhov

2013–2014 season

The season was presented under the helm of Greg Leaming, who has served as the Associate Artistic Director for Asolo Repertory Theatre and Director of the Conservatory for the past nine years.

 The School for Lies by David Ives, adapted from Moliere's Misanthrope
 Loot by Joe Orton
 How I Learned to Drive by Paula Vogel
 Antigone by Jean Anouilh

2012–2013 season

The season was presented under the helm of Greg Leaming, who has served as the Associate Artistic Director for Asolo Repertory Theatre and Director of the Conservatory for the past eight years.

 Twelfth Night by William Shakespeare
 The Aliens by Annie Baker
 Stop Kiss by Diana Son
 Candida by George Bernard Shaw

2011–2012 season

The season will be presented under the helm of Greg Leaming, who has been serving as the Associate Artistic Director for Asolo Repertory Theatre and Director of the Conservatory for the past seven years.

 The Brothers Karamazov by Fyodor Dostoyevsky, adapted by Anthony Clarvoe; November 1–20, 2011
 Lobby Hero by Kenneth Lonergan; January 3–22, 2012
 The Robbers by Friedrich Schiller; February 21-March 11, 2012
 Cloud Nine by Caryl Churchill; April 3–22, 2012

2010–2011 season

The season will be presented under the helm of Greg Leaming, who has been serving as the Associate Artistic Director for Asolo Repertory Theatre and Director of the Conservatory for the past six years. 
 The Two Gentlemen of Verona by William Shakespeare, directed by Greg Leaming; October 26, 2010 - November 14, 2010
 Reasons to Be Pretty by Neil LaBute, directed by Barbara Redmond; January 4, 2011 - January 23, 2011
 The Lady from the Sea by Henrik Ibsen, directed by Andrei Malaev-Babel; February 22, 2011 - March 13, 2011
 Tartuffe by Molière, directed by Wes Granthom; April 12, 2011 - May 1, 2011

2009–2010 season

 The Mystery Play by Roberto Aguirre-Sacasa; October 27, 2009 - November 15, 2009
 Blue/Orange by Joe Penhall; January 5, 2010 - January 24, 2010
 Machinal by Sophie Treadwell; March 2, 2010 - March 21, 2010
 The Game of Love and Chance by Pierre Marivaux; April 14, 2010 - May 3, 2010

Notable alumni
Damon Bonetti, Richard Falklen, Lesley Fera, Michael Piontek, Steve Rankin.

References

 About the FSU/Asolo Conservatory

External links
 Official website
 Asolo Repertory Theatre official website

Drama schools in the United States
Educational institutions established in 1968
Florida State University
Education in Sarasota, Florida
Theatre in Florida
1968 establishments in Florida